is the first of two double live albums by Japanese novelty heavy metal band Animetal. Released by Sony Records on October 1, 1999, it was recorded at the band's debut concert at the Shibuya Club Quattro on March 23, 1997.

Track listing
All tracks are arranged by Animetal.

Personnel
 - Lead vocals
 - Guitar
Masaki - Bass
 - Drums
 - Lead vocals (Animetal Lady)

with

 - Guitar

References

External links

1999 albums
Animetal albums
Live albums by Japanese artists
Japanese-language live albums
Sony Music Entertainment Japan albums